Joseph Murray (1914 – 31 October 1990), sometimes known as Joker Murray, was a Scottish professional footballer who played as a left half in the Scottish League for Hamilton Academical and Partick Thistle.

Career statistics

Honours 
Mid-Annandale
 Southern Counties Charity Cup: 1932–33
Hamilton Academical 'A'
 Scottish 2nd XI Cup: 1933–34
Ayr United
 Ayrshire Cup: 1935–36

References

Date of birth unknown
Scottish footballers
English Football League players
Brentford F.C. players
Date of death unknown
People from Uddingston
Mid-Annandale F.C. players
Association football wing halves
Hamilton Academical F.C. players
Ayr United F.C. players
Scottish Football League players
Partick Thistle F.C. players
1914 births
1990 deaths
Burnbank Athletic F.C. players
Blantyre Celtic F.C. players
Thorniewood United F.C. players
Stenhousemuir F.C. players
Scottish Junior Football Association players
Footballers from South Lanarkshire